Velar is a small village surrounded by hills in the Pali district of Rajasthan in India. Its population is around 1400. It is attached to the western railway. The nearest station is Nana (6 km).

Velar has a history dating back to more than a thousand years and hosts many temples. The village is very old. It has existed for the last 1200 years. People say  that it was in existence at the time of the ruler Prithiviraj Chouhan i.e. (1166-1192 AD).

The temple of Jalerii Mataji i.e. goddess of water, is very famous in this area. If any unmarried girl comes into the range of this God at any time, then it is necessary for that girl to come for the worship of Goddess Jaleri Mataji after the birth of her first child. There is also one very old temple of Shivji, which is called Navtirth, and another old temple dedicated to Devi Choudra Mataji. The village is named after the Goddess Vara Mataji. There is a very old Jain temple of Lord Adinath. This was built by the Jain community before 1750-1800 AD. Currently, no Jain resides in the village.

There is only one school in the village up to 8 standard and after 8 students go to nearby village which is 3 km from Velar.

There are many castes in this village, such as Rajput, Suthars, meghwals, meena, bhil, Rawals, Malis, Nais, Dewasis, and Vaishnaws. The majority of the villagers are farmers, and some have migrated to other cities like Mumbai, Ahmedabad, Delhi and Vadodara,

Gallery

 

Villages in Pali district